Dausa is a city and administrative headquarters of Dausa district in the state of Rajasthan, India. It is 55 km from Jaipur, 240 km from Delhi and located on Jaipur-Agra National Highway (NH-21).Current population is around 1.25 lakh as per latest data available.

Etymology
As Dausa city is surrounded by Mahadev in five directions (Nilkanth, Gupteshwer, Sahajnath, Somnath and Baijnath), so it was named from Sanskrit word Dhau and Sa.

History 
Before 1947,Dausa Will be Part Of princely state Of JAIPURS kachwaha Rajput Rajas. Dausa is situated in a region widely known as Dundhar. The Chauhans also ruled this land in 10th Century A.D. Dausa has privileged to become first capital of the then Dundhar Region. The Chauhan Raja Soodh Dev ruled this region during 996 to 1006 AD. Later, from 1006 AD to 1036 AD, Rajput Raja Dule Rai ruled this region for 30 years.

Dausa has given prominent freedom fighters to the nation. Tikaram Paliwal and Ram Karan Joshi were amongst the freedom fighters who gave their valuable contribution for the fight for independence and for amalgamation of the princely states to form the state of Rajasthan. Tikaram Paliwal was the first elected Chief Minister of Rajasthan in 1952 after independence. Also, Ram Karan Joshi was the first Panchayati Raj Minister of Rajasthan who submitted the first Panchayati Raj Bill in the Vidhansabha in 1952.

The poet Sunderdas was born on Chaitra Shukla Navami in Vikram Samvat 1653 in Dausa. He was a renowned Nirgun Panthi Sant and wrote 42 Grantha, out of which Gyan Sundaram & Sunder Vilas are famous.

Geography 
It has an average elevation of 333 metres (1072 feet).
It is one of the 5 Districts of Jaipur division (Alwar, Dausa, Jaipur, Jhunjhunun, Sikar.) and is surrounded with 6 districts, namely, Jaipur, Tonk, Sawai Madhopur, karauli, Bharatpur & Alwar.

Demographics 
 Indian census, Dausa town had total population of 85,960.  Males constitute 45,369 of the population and females 40,591. Dausa has an average literacy rate of 69.17%, lower than the national average of 74.04%: male literacy is 84.54% and, female literacy is 52.33%. In Dausa, 11,042 of the population is under 6 years of age.

Economy 
The economy of Dausa district is mainly dependent on agriculture as 68.2 percent workers in the district are either cultivators or agricultural labourers. However the district percent of such workers is higher than the state average of 62.1 percent. Work participation rate (WPR) of Dausa district has recorded 41.9 percent and gender gap in WPR is 9.5 percent points. In Dausa district among the workers the percentage of cultivators, agricultural labourers, workers in household industry and other workers (category of workers) are 57.1, 11.1, 2.5 and 29.2 percent respectively.

Culture

Stone Carving
Sikandra is situated at 25 km on NH-11 towards Agra. This place has made its mark in the domestic as well as international market for its sandstone carvings from districts adjoining Dausa.

Local Festivals

Basant Panchmi Mela
At district headquarters, Basant Panchmi Mela (during February every year) is organised with the worship of idols of Raghunathji, Narshingji, and god Surya. The festival is celebrated for three days with a large local market for villagers to procure essential requirements for the entire year. Besides this, it has all arrangements for rural entertainment. Therefore, it has very much attention and importance for rural population scattered in the district.

Dolchi Holi
In Pavta village, the young men of Gurjar caste, celebrates the traditional Holi with a difference. On the next day of Dhulandi, those young men throw a jet of water on each other using a small pot made up of leather from the four adjacent ponds prepared for this purpose. It goes on for one hour and they face it with brevity and enthusiasm.

Tourism 
Dausa has many places to visit like as Abhaneri and Mehandipur Balaji Temple. In Abhaneri, many movies have been shot including Paheli.
 Abhaneri: Abhaneri is known for its post-Gupta or early medieval monuments. It is situated at about 33 km from the district headquarters towards Bandikui. The Chand Baori (Step Well) and Harshat Mata Temple are the important places to visit.
 Getolav Bird Habitat: Located at 200 meter from National Highway 11, migratory birds.
 Bhandarej: Bhandarej is known for the walls, sculptures, decorative latticework, and terracotta utensils found in the excavation. Bhandarej also has 18th-century step-well called Bhandrej Baori.
 Khawaraoji: Khawaraoji was the residence of the then ruler Raoji and Jaiman purohits.
 Jhajhirampura : Jhajhirampura is known for the natural water tank and temples of Rudra (Shiv), Balaji (Hanuman), Bhairav nath ji , Devnarayan chouhan ji temple and other religious god and goddess.

Temples and religious spots 

 Mehandipur Balaji Temple: The temple of Bajrang Bali (Hanuman) god is known for treatment of mentally disturbed people.
 Shri Paplaj Mata Mandir: The Temple of Paplaj Mata Ji is situated in the sub-district Lalsot.
 Shri Binouri Balaji Mandir: The Temple of Binouri Balaji Ji is situated in the sub-district Lalsot.

Transport

By Rail
The district is well connected by rail. It is on Delhi-Jaipur and Agra-Jaipur train route, which gives it great connectivity. The district has also one important railway station, namely, Bandikui Junction. Dausa railway station is a very important railway station of north-western railway under Jaipur division and now the new railway line is under construction and starts very soon, after this Dausa railway station will be the junction.

By Road
NH 11 passes through the district. It covers about 85 km in the district which includes district headquarters, Sikandra and Mahwa. Dausa is 55 km from Jaipur on NH-11 and well connected with Agra, Delhi and other surrounding districts viz. Karauli, Sawai Madhopur and Bharatpur by road. Further, NH-11A also passes through the district covering Dausa & Lalsot Tehsil regions. Two Mega Highways, to be constructed by RIDCOR, namely Alwar to Sikandra (81 km) and Lalsot to Kota (195 km) will pass through the district. The district has four-lane facility on NH 11.

Villages
 

Khan Bhankri
BANDIKUI

References

External links 
 

Cities and towns in Dausa district
Former capital cities in India